Asperula breviflora is a species of flowering plant in the family Rubiaceae. It was described in 1849 and is endemic to Syria.

References 

brachyphylla
Taxa named by Pierre Edmond Boissier
Flora of Syria